Bidot is a surname, likely of French origin. Notable people with the surname include:

Denise Bidot (born 1986), American plus-sized fashion model
Jean Bidot (1905-1986), French professional cyclist
Marcel Bidot (1902-1995), French professional road bicycle racer